Cethromycin, trade name Restanza (initially known as ABT-773) is a ketolide antibiotic undergoing research for the treatment of community acquired pneumonia (CAP) and for the prevention of post-exposure inhalational anthrax, and was given an "orphan drug" status for this indication.  Originally discovered and developed by Abbott, it was acquired by Advanced Life Sciences Inc. for further development.

On October 1, 2008 Advanced Life Sciences submitted a New Drug Application (NDA) to Food and Drug Administration (FDA) for cethromycin to treat mild-to-moderate community acquired pneumonia.

On December 3, 2008 Advanced Life Sciences announced that this New Drug Application has been accepted for filing by the FDA.

In June 2009, an FDA Anti-Infective Drugs Advisory Committee review found insufficient evidence for cethromycin efficacy in treatment of community acquired pneumonia, as the Phase 3 clinical trial followed standards that were updated after the clinical trial but three months prior to review. The committee did, however, find the drug safe to use.

References

Further reading
Interaction of the New Ketolide ABT-773 (Cethromycin) with Human Polymorphonuclear Neutrophils and the Phagocytic Cell Line PLB-985 In Vitro. 2004

Quinolines
Ketolide antibiotics